Bettie Serveert plays Venus in Furs and other Velvet Underground songs is a live album by the Dutch indie rock band Bettie Serveert, released in 1998. The songs are all Velvet Underground covers, recorded during a concert at the Paradiso, in Amsterdam, in 1997.

Track listing
"Beginning to See the Light" – 5:30 (writer: Lou Reed)
"Stephanie Says" – 3:20 (Reed)
"What Goes On" – 3:59 (Reed)
"Venus in Furs" – 6:18 (Reed)
"Sunday Morning" – 3:21 (Reed/John Cale)
"The Black Angel's Death Song" – 5:40 (Reed/Cale)
"I Can't Stand It" – 3:59 (Reed)
"European Son" – 8:45 (Reed/Cale/Morrison/Tucker)
"Rock & Roll" – 8:08 (Reed)
"After Hours" – 2:57 (Reed)

Personnel
Carol van Dijk – vocals, guitar
Herman Bunskoeke – bass, vocals
Peter Visser – guitar, vocals, xylophone, violin
Berend Dubbe – drums, vocals, tapes, guitar

References

Bettie Serveert albums
1998 albums
Covers albums